Frailes or Los Frailes may refer to:

 Frailes, Spain, a municipality in the province of Jaén, Spain
 Frailes, Desamparados, Costa Rica, a town in the Desamparados canton, San José province, Costa Rica
 Frailes, Guaynabo, Puerto Rico, a barrio in Puerto Rico
 Frailes, Yauco, Puerto Rico, a barrio in Puerto Rico
 Islas Los Frailes, a Venezuelan archipelago of rock islets
 Los Frailes, a beach north of Puerto López, Ecuador
 Los Frailes mine, Andalusia, Spain, where the 1998 Doñana disaster began

See also
 Fraile (disambiguation)
 Cordillera de los Frailes, a mountainous region in the Bolivian Andes